People in Stores (aka PiS) was an American, Boston-based band, from the formative punk/new wave era of the early 1980s. Playing with Mission of Burma, Wild Stares, Vacuumheads, CCCP-TV, V; and The Neats, PiS performed its own unique brand of original post-punk pop music in storied clubs around Boston such as the Underground, The Rat, Storyville, and The Channel. Referred to as "the clipboard crowd" by Dan Salzman of the Maps, Art Yard and Christmas fame, PiS had a uniquely strange and intellectual approach to the crafting of a pop song. The band recorded a single, an EP and contributed to the Propeller Records compilation tape during its recording days. The band was started in 1979 and disbanded in 1983. Band members Margery Meadow and Karen Gickas, along with Thalia Zedek and Lori Green, went on to form the well-regarded, all-woman band Dangerous Birds, while David Drucker and Seven Coursen, along with Ramona Herboldsheimer (Wild Stares) and Andrew Joslin (Noise Pencil), formed the all-instrumental band the Post-Moderns.

Band members
Ken Travers: Guitar/Vocals
Margery Meadow: Bass/Vocals
Karen Gickas: Drums/Vocals
Seven Coursen: Sax/Percussion
David Drucker: Guitar/Vocals
Fran Miller: Bass/Attitude

Recordings
"Metaphor" / "White Funk" (Propeller Records Single, 1981)
"Factory" (Propeller Product EP w/ The Neats, CCCPTV, The Wild Stares, 1981)
Cat and Mouse / Cheap Detective (Propeller Product compilation tape, 1982)

See also
 List of record labels

External links
Robert Christgau Article - Propeller EP Review
Article from The Noise - Propeller Compilation Tape
Article about The Neats - Propeller EP article & artwork
Downloadable MP3s of PiS Recordings

American new wave musical groups
Punk rock groups from Massachusetts
Musical groups from Boston